The Serga is a river in Sverdlovsk Oblast, Russia.

The river is much used by rafters. The town of Nizhniye Sergi lies by the Serga.

References

Rivers of Sverdlovsk Oblast